On 29 December 2015, a suicide bomber detonated his explosives in the front entrance of a regional branch of the National Database and Registration Authority, which is responsible for issuing ID cards in northwestern city of Mardan, Pakistan. The blast killed 26 people and more than 50 were wounded. Leader of Jamaat-ul-Ahrar, a faction of the Tehrik-i-Taliban Pakistan claimed responsibility for the attack.

Bomber 
Syed Abdullah, resident of Shahi Abad, Mohibanda in Mardan district, was found to be the bomber.

See also
 2013 Mardan funeral bombing
 List of terrorist incidents, 2015
 Terrorist incidents in Pakistan in 2015

References

21st-century mass murder in Pakistan
Mass murder in 2015
Massacres in Pakistan
Terrorist incidents in Pakistan in 2015
2015 murders in Pakistan
Murder in Pakistan